Kumar Sabapathy Iyer is a British economist and civil servant. He is currently the Director General for Economics, Science and Technology at the Foreign, Commonwealth and Development Office (FCDO). He leads all cross-cutting work on international economic policy including oversight of the UK’s sanctions regime. His most recent roles include Director General in the Prime Minister’s COVID-19 Taskforce and before that Chief Economist and a Board Member at the Foreign and Commonwealth Office (FCO).

Early life 
Born in London, Iyer grew up in India and then Stoke-on-Trent, and went to school at Blurton High School and then Stoke-on-Trent Sixth Form College, and then read economics at Durham University (BA). As an undergraduate he served as President of the Durham Union. He continued his education at Corpus Christi College, Cambridge (MPhil), where he was a Bank of England scholar. He was later a Kennedy Scholar and Teaching Fellow in International Capital Markets at Harvard University.

Career 
Iyer joined the civil service, being hired from Boston Consulting Group into the Prime Minister's Strategy Unit in 2008 as part of the UK government's response to the 2007 financial crisis. In 2010 he transferred to HM Treasury as the Deputy Director for Strategy, Planning & Budget, and then as the Head of Financial Sector Interventions.

From 2013 until 2017, Iyer served as India as the FCO's Deputy High Commissioner for Western India, based in Mumbai, and simultaneously as UK Trade & Investment's Director General for Economics, Trade and Commercial Affairs in South Asia, a role currently known as Her Majesty's Trade Commissioner.

After leaving his post in India, Iyer worked as a "Visiting Academic" at Hertford College, Oxford, and as a senior partner in Oliver Wyman. In June 2019, it was announced that Iyer would serve as the Foreign & Commonwealth Office's first chief economist, on the FCO Board. He was consequently the FCO's first ethnic-minority Board member.

Iyer was a Director General in the Prime Minister's COVID-19 Taskforce and he is currently Director General Economics, Science and Technology at the FCDO. This was part of structural changes in the Department to meet the immediate and long-term challenges posed by Russia’s invasion of Ukraine. In this role, Iyer coordinates international economic policy – ensuring the FCDO makes full use of all economic tools in its foreign policy.

Personal life 
Iyer married Kathryn Ann Worth, a criminal barrister at Middle Temple in 2004; they have one son and one daughter.

References

External links 

 Iyer's page on the British government's site
 Iyer's page at Somerville College's site

1977 births
Alumni of Corpus Christi College, Cambridge
Harvard University alumni
British civil servants
British economists
Living people
Alumni of University College, Durham
Presidents of the Durham Union